Zygaena cuvieri  is a species of moth in the Zygaenidae family found from Armenia and Syria to Central Asia. In Seitz it is described as follows: "This large fine Burnet has rosy-red wings, the forewing being divided into 3 areas by two black-grey bands; a broad collar and a rosy abdominal belt. Inhabits Anterior Asia, from Syria through Mesopotamia to Turkestan."

References

External links
Images representing Zygaena cuvieri at Bold
Lepiforum.de

Moths described in 1828
Zygaena